Events in the year 2018 in Kerala

Incumbents 
Governors of Kerala - P. Sathasivam

Chief ministers of Kerala - Pinarayi Vijayan

Events

January - March 

 January 12 - First edition of Loka Kerala Sabha held at Thiruvananthapuram.
 January 31 - Sreejith a youth from Parassala ends his 782 days long solitary protest in front of Kerala Government Secretariat following Central Bureau of Investigation probe in his brother Sreejev's custodial death in 2014.
 February 22 - Madhu, a 30 year old Adivasi man from Attappadi died following mob lynching at Palakkad district.
 March 8 - Supreme Court of India set asides Kerala High Court verdict in Hadiya case.

April - June 
 April 1 - Kerala football team defeats West Bengal in Santosh Trophy Final held at Salt Lake Stadium through Penalty shootout.
 May 2 - Nipah virus outbreak in Kerala at Perambra.
 May 27 - Kevin, a 23 year old Dalit Christian from Kottayam district was abducted and murdered in an act of Honor killing for marrying a girl named Neenu Chacko from an affluent Christian family.
 May 29 - Kerala Bharatiya Janata Party leader Kummanam Rajasekharan becomes Governor of Mizoram.
 June 27 - Several key members of Women in Cinema Collective resigned from Association of Malayalam Movie Artists following their decision to bring back rape accused Dileep back to the association.

July - September 

 July 2 - A student of Maharaja's College, Ernakulam and Students' Federation of India activist Abhimanyu stabbed to death by Campus Front of India activists inside college campus.
 August 16 - 2018 Kerala floods the largest flood after Great flood of 99 occurred.
 September 8 - A group of Nun protests at Kochi against attempt by Kerala Police and Catholic Church to protect rape accused bishop Franco Mulakkal.
 September 28 - Sabarimala verdict by Supreme Court of India allows entry of women to the temple.

October - December 
 November 5 - Sanalkumar, a 32 year old electrician from Neyyattinkara was killed after being pushed by Deputy superintendent of police Neyyattinkara in front of a moving vehicle following an altercation.
 November 8 - Protests in Kayamkulam by Jacobite Church members following denial of burial of a 95 year old man at a church controlled by Malankara Orthodox faction.
 November 13 - Deputy superintendent of police Neyyattinkara, Harikumar the key accused in Sanalkumar murder case committed suicide in his house at Kallambalam.
 November 15 - Kerala State Road Transport Corporation launched 10 Electric buses and becomes the first South Indian state to roll out Electric vehicles for Road Transport Corporations.

Deaths 

 May 2 - Kottayam Pushpanath, 80, writer.
 July 8 - M. M. Jacob, 91, Former governor of Meghalaya.
 October 2  - Balabhaskar, 30, violinist.

See also 

 History of Kerala
 2018 in India
 2018 Kerala floods

References 

2010s in Kerala